Kenny Starfighter is a Swedish science fiction television series that follows the titular hero as he fights against the evil lord Dr. Deo. Although aimed at children, this show was popular with adults as well. A film, Kenny Begins, was made in 2009. In June 2022, it was announced that a new season of the series will premiere in the fall, and will take place 20 years after the first season. It began airing on September 21, 2022, and so far has only aired one episode. It is unknown if there will be any more in the second season.

Premise 
Kenny Starfighter, a Galactic Hero of dubious ability, is sent to Earth to find and stop the evil Doctor Deo as the Galaxy's last hope after all other Galactic Heroes have gone MIA. Whilst in pursuit of the doctor his space-bus crashes in a small Swedish town. Here he learns that the teachers at a local school have been acting bizarrely and joins forces with some of the school children to investigate this. They find the person behind the strange behavior at the school is none other than Dr. Deo. Through their combined efforts they manage to defeat him and save Kenny's home planet Mylta.

Cast

Episodes

Season 1 (1997)

Season 2 (2022)

References 
Kenny Starfighter at International Hero

Notes

External links
Kenny Starfighter at Superheroes Lives (Swedish)
Official website for the film

Swedish science fiction television series
Swedish children's television series
1990s Swedish television series